Group Captain John Bussey, OBE (1895-1979) was in charge of Reconnaissance for the British Royal Air Force during World War II.  As Directorate of Overseas Surveys he had an Antarctic glacier named after him: the Bussey Glacier.

He was on board the Imperial Airways flying boat Courtier which crash landed near Athens in 1937.

References

1895 births
1979 deaths